All Star United is a Christian rock band that was formed by solo artist Ian Eskelin in 1996. The band is known for clever and sometimes sarcastic lyrics, as they frequently use their songs as vehicles to lampoon perceived excesses in Western culture. Their musical style combines elements of alternative rock and Britpop, anchored by melodically powerful choruses.

All Star United has released five full-length albums, a collector's EP, and a "best of" collection that included two previously unreleased songs. Their latest full-length project (The Good Album) was released internationally in 2009, but the US release was delayed until early 2010 and includes an additional radio single "Beautiful Way." The band has had several No. 1 charting songs in the United States, including the songs "Smash Hit" and "Superstar". They also had a No. 1 single in Singapore titled "If We Were Lovers". Band leader and founder, Eskelin has also released three solo projects and currently writes and produces for a variety of bands and artists. In 2008 Eskelin received a Dove Award for "Producer of the Year", and was nominated again in the same category in 2009.

All Star United's songs have been licensed in recent years for use on ABC's The Evidence, the movie Saved!, the trailer for the film Superbad, and multiple CBS network imaging campaigns.

Band history
All Star United was formed in 1996 by frontman Ian Eskelin, drummer Christian Crowe, guitarist Brian Whitman, keyboardist Patrick McCallum, and bassist Gary Miller. Shortly after, Miller was replaced by Adrian Walther, and guitarist Dave Clo was added to the line-up. They released their eponymous debut album in 1997 to much critical acclaim. They followed it with International Anthems for the Human Race in 1998, which received equal praise. The band toured heavily in the United States and internationally during this period.

Amidst some line-up changes and label changes, the band released a compilation album titled Smash Hits in 2000. In 2002, the band signed with Delirious? record label, Furious Records, and released their third studio album titled Revolution.

After this, the band retired from heavy touring while Eskelin recorded and released a solo project and produced albums for several other artists. However, in 2007, the original line-up (minus Patrick) reunited and released Love and Radiation.

All Star United's most recent project, The Good Album, was released internationally in 2009, with a delayed US release in early January 2010.

Discography 
 All Star United (1997)
 International Anthems for the Human Race (1998) 
 Smash Hits (2000)
 Let's Get Crazy (2000)
 Revolution (2002)
 Love and Radiation (2007)
 The Good Album (2009)

Music videos
 "Bright Red Carpet" (1997)
 "Weirdo" (2002)
 "Sweet Jesus" (2002)

Band members

Current
 Ian Eskelin - Lead Vocals (1996–present)
 Adrian Walther - Bass (1997–2002, 2006–present)
 Christian Crowe - Drums (1996–2000, 2006–present)
 Mike Payne - Guitars (2002–present)
 Brian Whitman - Guitar (1996–present)

Former
 Patrick McCallum - Keyboards (1996–1999)
 Jeremy Hunter - Bass (2002–2003)
 Gary Miller - Bass (1996–1997)
 Dave Clo - Guitar (1997–1999)
 Troy Daugherty - Guitar (2000)
 Stephen Ekstedt - Guitar (1999–2000)
 Matt Payne - Drums (2000–2003)

References

External links
 

American Christian rock groups
Musical groups established in 1997